.va is the Internet country code top-level domain (ccTLD) for the Vatican City State. It is administered by the Vatican Internet Service.



Background 
The .va top-level domain was created in 1995 by Archbishop John Patrick Foley of the Pontifical Council for Social Communications. The website Vatican.va went live on Christmas day 1995.

Description 
Second-level domains are not available to the public.

Name and email servers within the .va namespace include john.vatican.va (DNS and email), michael.vatican.va (DNS), paul.vatican.va (email), lists.vatican.va (email), and vatiradio.va (email).

Websites
At least 23 easily adopted names starting with "www" in the .va zone, with many more email-only subdomains.

See also 
Index of Vatican City-related articles
.catholic

References

Computer-related introductions in 1995
Communications in Vatican City
Dicastery for Communication
Country code top-level domains
Council of European National Top Level Domain Registries members